Urakawites is an extinct ammonite from the Upper Cretaceous (Campanian) of Japan, Sakhalin, Russia, British Columbia, Canada and possibly Germany and Angola. Urakawites is placed in the family is Pachydiscidae.

Urakawites is characterized by a bituberculate (meaning it has two rows of tubercles on either side), strongly ribbed, moderately compressed shell.

References
 Arkell, et al., 1957. Mesozoic Ammonoidea. Treatise on Invertebrate Paleontology Part L. Geol Soc of America and Univ Kansas Press. R.C. Moore ed.
 Matsumoto, T. 1955. The bituberculate pachydiscids from Hokkaido and Saghalien. Studies on the Cretaceous ammonites from Hokkaido and Sakhalin 8. Memoirs of the Faculty of Science, Kyushu University, Series D, vol. 5, no. 3, pp. 153–184
 Urakawites rotalinoides (Yabe)

Ammonitida genera
Cretaceous ammonites
Campanian life
Desmoceratoidea